Tillandsia tragophoba is a species of flowering plant in the genus Tillandsia. This species is endemic to Chile.

References
Chilean Bromeliaceae: diversity, distribution and evaluation of conservation status (Published online: 10 March 2009)

tragophoba
Endemic flora of Chile